Chiloglanis microps is a species of upside-down catfish endemic to the Democratic Republic of the Congo where it occurs in the Lufira River system.  This species grows to a length of  SL.

References

External links 

microps
Freshwater fish of Africa
Fish of the Democratic Republic of the Congo
Endemic fauna of the Democratic Republic of the Congo
Fish described in 1965
Taxa named by Hubert Matthes